Eusceptis flavifrimbriata is a moth of the family Noctuidae first described by Todd in 1971. It is found in Mexico.

References

Acontiinae